The 2021–22 season will see Glasgow Warriors compete in the competitions: the United Rugby Championship and the European Rugby Champions Cup.

Season overview

A new league structure was announced on 15 June 2021. With the addition of the 4 Super Rugby Unlocked franchises of the Bulls, Sharks, Stormers and the Lions, the Pro14 rebranded itself as the United Rugby Championship.

There will be 4 regional conferences with teams playing their regional rivals home and away; and teams from the other conferences either home or away.

With 16 teams in total, this means 18 normal matches in the season before the play-offs.

As Scotland and Italy only have 2 teams each in the United Rugby Championship, they were placed in one regional conference; the Irish sides, Welsh sides and South African sides had their own regional conferences respectively.

Team

Coaches

 Head coach:  Danny Wilson 
 Assistant coach:   Kenny Murray (to January 2022)
 Assistant coach:   Peter Murchie
 Assistant coach:   Nigel Carolan
 Scrum Coach:   Alasdair Dickinson
 Head Strength and Conditioning Coach:  Cillian Reardon 
 Senior Athletic Performance Coach: Damien O'Donoghue
 Sport Scientist: Robin Reidy
 Lead Performance Analyst: Greg Woolard
 Asst. Performance Analyst: Graham O'Riordan
 Asst. Performance Analyst: Eilidh Wright

Staff

 Managing Director: Alastair Kellock 
 Chairman: Charles Shaw
 Advisory Group: Walter Malcolm, Douglas McCrea, Alan Lees, Jim Preston, Paul Taylor
 Rugby Operations Manager: Kenny Brown 
 Assistant Operations Manager: Martin Malone 
 Kit & Equipment Manager: Dougie Mills 
 Head groundsman: Colin Mackinnon 
 Team Doctor: Dr. Jonathan Hanson 
 Clinical Manager and Lead Physiotherapist: Andrew Boag 
 Senior Team Physiotherapist: Francesco Fronzoni 
 Senior Team Physiotherapist: Michael Clark 
 Junior Physiotherapist: Christina Finlay 
 Communications and Marketing Manager: Cameron MacAllister 
 Marketing manager: Claire Scott 
 Media manager: Duncan Seller 
 Content Producer: Cameron Avery 
 Communications Manager: Craig Wright 
 Commercial Manager: Jamie Robertson 
 Partnership Account Manager: Catherine Bunch 
 Partnership Account Manager: Jim Taylor 
 Community Manager: Stuart Lewis

Squad

Scottish Rugby Academy Stage 3 players

These players are given a professional contract by the Scottish Rugby Academy. Although given placements they are not contracted by Glasgow Warriors. Players graduate from the Academy when a professional club contract is offered.

These players are assigned to Glasgow Warriors for the season 2021–22.

Academy players promoted in the course of the season are listed with the main squad.

  Jamie Drummond – Hooker
  Angus Fraser – Hooker
  Euan Ferrie – Lock
  Alex Samuel – Lock
  Max Williamson – Lock
  Gregor Brown – Flanker
  Rory Jackson – Flanker
  Rhys Tait – Flanker
  Euan Cunningham – Fly-half
  Christian Townsend – Fly-half
  Michael Gray – Centre
  Robbie McCallum – Centre
  Finlay Callaghan – Wing
  Ross McKnight – Wing

Back up players

Other players used by Glasgow Warriors over the course of the season.

Player statistics

During the 2021–22 season, Glasgow have used 47 different players in competitive games. The table below shows the number of appearances and points scored by each player.

Staff movements

Coaches

Personnel in

  Alasdair Dickinson from  Bristol Bears
  Nigel Carolan from  Connacht

Personnel out

  Jonny Bell to  Worcester Warriors
  Kenny Murray to  Scotland U20s

Medical

Personnel in

Personnel out

Staff

Personnel in

Personnel out

Player movements

Academy promotions

  Murphy Walker from Scottish Rugby Academy

Player transfers

In

 
 
  Simon Berghan from  Edinburgh
 
 
 
 
  Ally Miller from  Edinburgh
  Domingo Miotti from  Western Force
  Sebastián Cancelliere from  Jaguares
  Murray McCallum from  Edinburgh
  Brad Thyer from  Cardiff Rugby (loan)
  Robbie Fergusson from  GB 7s
  Walter Fifita from  North Harbour
  Nathan McBeth from  Lions
  Tom Jordan from  Ayrshire Bulls
  Ewan Ashman from  Sale Sharks (loan)

Out

  Adam Hastings to  Gloucester
  Huw Jones to  Harlequins
  Chris Fusaro retired
  Alex Allan to  Hong Kong Scottish
  Nikola Matawalu to  Montauban
  D'Arcy Rae to  Bath
  Fotu Lokotui to  Agen
  Mesu Dolokoto to  Fijian Drua
  TJ Ioane to  Union Sportive Bressane
  Lee Jones released
  Ian Keatley released
  Paddy Kelly released
  Robbie Nairn to  Ayrshire Bulls
  Aki Seiuli to  Dragons
  George Thornton to  Ayrshire Bulls
  Brad Thyer to  Cardiff Rugby (loan ends)
  Ewan Ashman to  Sale Sharks (loan ends)
  Murray McCallum to  Worcester Warriors
  Peter Horne to  Ayrshire Bulls (as Head Coach)
  Nick Grigg to  Red Hurricanes Osaka
  Jamie Dobie to  Bay of Plenty Steamers (loan)

Competitions

Pre-season and friendlies

The first of two friendlies was confirmed to be against Worcester Warriors. A second friendly, to be played a week before the Worcester match, was confirmed to be against the Newcastle Falcons at Scotstoun Stadium.

The side named to play against Newcastle Falcons was affected by several of the Glasgow players being in isolation due to the coronavirus pandemic; and Super 6 players and academy players were drafted into the Warriors line-up.

In the match against Newcastle Falcons, both Ratu Tagive and Kiran McDonald received injuries which will keep them out of action for months. After a collision with Newcastle fullback Mike Brown, Tagive broke his cheekbone, requiring surgery. McDonald took a blow to his kidney in the match.

A 'Clash of the Warriors' cup was specially produced for the match with Worcester Warriors. It is intended that a return match at Scotstoun will also play for the cup in the following pre-season.

Head Coach Danny Wilson was pleased with the two friendly outings; and especially the Worcester win. He stated after the 'Clash of the Warriors':
Last week wasn’t about winning, it was about the first hit out and getting the lads playing some rugby, but tonight was about coming here to get an away win because our next game will be about winning away so we came here to do that. There were a couple of sticky moments in the first half when they were attacking well and the whole game was very physical, but in the second half in particular some guys took their opportunities so we have some headaches ahead of the first selection. It is a case of small stepping stones in pre-season, but getting everybody out there playing and no major injuries is good – but we won’t read too much into it. Still, when you set out your stall to play hard and get a win, not just giving people a game, then it is good to get a win and the players will get some confidence because of that.

A Super6 pro-alignment fixture was announced for 18 June 2022. Players from Ayrshire Bulls, Stirling County and Boroughmuir Bears will represent Glasgow Warriors. Players from Watsonians, Heriot’s Rugby and Southern Knights will represent Edinburgh. The Warriors team was mixed with current Academy prospects like Jamie Drummond, Rory Jackson and Michael Gray, alongside ex-Warriors like Robert Beattie and the previous Academy player Logan Trotter; the Australian 7s international player Liam McNamara and the Cyprus international player Marcus Holden. The Edinburgh side had breakthrough Edinburgh players Kwagga van Niekerk and Harrison Courtney, ex-Edinburgh players like Jason Baggott and Cameron Fenton (Fenton has also played for Glasgow Warriors); alongside the Wales international 7s player Joe Jenkins and the Scotland international 7s player Nyle Godsmark; and former London Irish player Rory Brand.

Match 1

Glasgow Warriors: Ollie Smith (Cole Forbes 51); Rufus McLean (Finlay Callaghan 61), Sione Tuipulotu (Nick Grigg 61), Stafford McDowall (Pete Horne 51), Ratu Tagive (Logan Trotter 41); Duncan Weir (Ross Thompson 51), Sean Kennedy (Jamie Dobie 51); Tom Lambert (George Thornton 51), Johnny Matthews (Grant Stewart 51), Murray McCallum (Murphy Walker 51), Lewis Bean (Max Williamson 51), Richie Gray (Rob Harley 51), Kiran McDonald (Scott Cummings 51), Rory Darge (Tom Gordon 51), Ryan Wilson (Rory Jackson 51)

Newcastle Falcons: 15 Mike Brown, 14 Ollie Lindsay-Hague, 13 George Wacokecoke, 12 Pete Lucock, 11 Iwan Stephens, 10 Brett Connon, 9 Sam Stuart; 1 Adam Brocklebank, 2 George McGuigan, 3 Mark Tampin, 4 Marco Fuser, 5 Philip van der Walt, 6 Josh Basham, 7 Will Welch, 8 Callum Chick
Replacements: 16 Robbie Smith, 17 Kyle Cooper, 18 Conor Kenny, 19 Matthew Dalton, 20 Carl Fearns, 21 James Blackett, 22 Will Haydon-Wood, 23 Ben Stevenson, [blank shirts]: Mark Dormer, Oscar Caudle, George Merrick, Freddie Lockwood, Marcus Tiffen, Ewan Greenlaw, Louie Johnson (all used)

Match 2

Worcester Warriors: 1 Ethan Waller, 2 Scott Baldwin, 3 Christian Judge, 4 Matt Garvey, 5 Justin Clegg, 6 Ted Hill (CC), 7 Sam Lewis, 8 Kyle Hatherell, 9 Willi Heinz (CC), 10 Owen Williams, 11 Harri Doel, 12 Francois Venter, 13 Ollie Lawrence, 14 Noah Heward, 15 Melani Nanai Replacements: Niall Annett, Lewis Holsey, Jay Tyack, Graham Kitchener, James Scott, Morgan Monks, Caleb Montgomery, Matt Kvesic, Will Chudley, Billy Searle, Tom Howe, Ashley Beck, Oli Morris, Perry Humphreys, Jamie Shillcock [all used – except James Scott & Tom Howe]

Glasgow Warriors: 1. Tom Lambert, 2. Johnny Matthews, 3. Simon Berghan, 4. Lewis Bean, 5. Richie Gray,6. Scott Cummings, 7. Rory Darge, 8. Ryan Wilson (Captain), 9. George Horne, 10. Ross Thompson, 11. Cole Forbes, 12. Sam Johnson, 13. Sione Tuipulotu, 14. Rufus McLean, 15. Stafford McDowall
Replacements: Grant Stewart, Brad Thyer, Murray McCallum, Murphy Walker, Rob Harley, Max Williamson, Rory Jackson, Thomas Gordon, Jack Dempsey, Jamie Dobie, Duncan Weir, Pete Horne, Nick Grigg, Ollie Smith, Finlay Callaghan

Match 3

Glasgow Warriors: 1. George Bresse, 2. Jerry Blyth-Lafferty, 3. Michael Scott, 4. Rory Jackson, 5. Adam Sinclair, 6. Lewis McNamara, 7. Connor Gordon [Co-captain], 8. Benedict Grant, 9. Ruairidh Swan, 10. Marcus Holden [Co-captain], 11. Aaron Tait, 12. Robert Beattie, 13. Michael Gray, 14. Elias Caven, 15. Logan TrotterReplacements: 16. Jamie Drummond, 17. Callum Smith, 18. Calvin Henderson, 19. Jack Fisher, 20. Trystan Andrews, 21. Euan McAra, 22. Liam McNamara, 23. Stevie Hamilton

Edinburgh: 1. Harrison Courtney, 2. Michael Liness [Captain], 3. A. P. McWilliam, 4. Josh King, 5. Fraser Hastie, 6. Kwagga Van Niekerk, 7. Wallace Nelson, 8. Karl Main, 9. Rory Brand, 10. Jason Baggott, 11. Aiden Cross, 12. Dom Croetzer [Vice-Captain], 13. Nyle Godsmark, 14. Bill Wara, 15. Joe JenkinsReplacements: 16. Cameron Fenton, 17. Chris Keen, 18. Martin McGinley 19. Scott McGinley, 20. Gregor Nelson, 21. Jed Gelderbloom, 22. Greg Cannie, 23. Robbie Chalmers

United Rugby Championship

The season's opener was away to Ulster. It was a match the Warriors could have won scoring 4 tries – but unfortunately they conceded 5 tries. There were some positives; 2 bonus points were earned and Rory Darge secured the man of the match. Darge's performance prompted Jack Dempsey to compare his work-rate with that of Australian captain Michael Hooper. The home match against Sharks saw the Warriors quickly secure a bonus point in the first half. Scoring a quick try in the second half, the Warriors game seemed to lose a gear after Sione Tuipulotu ran in for what would have been a sixth try, but the referee Ben Whitehouse chalked it off for obstruction. This let the South African side regroup somewhat and at the end of the match the Sharks had scored 3 tries; which was an otherwise comfortable game for the Glasgow giants. Glasgow Assistant Coach Peter Murchie was delighted with Glasgow's play up until the Warriors eased off: "I thought we were excellent for the first 50 minutes – we scored some fantastic tries and that’s probably some of the best rugby we’ve played since I’ve been here as a coach." Darge received another man of the match award against the Lions. The Lions proved toothless with no clean breaks in the match but the kicking of EW Viljoen kept the South African side in contention. Danny Wilson said: "We played so well in the first half and created so much, but it was a little bit forced with the offloads. We were trying to force the issue when we should have been more patient. In the second half, the weather came in and there were more scrums. We didn’t want that, because we knew the scrum was a really powerful weapon for them."

League table

Results

Round 1

Round 2

Round 3

Round 4

Round 5

Round 6

Round 7

Round 8

Round 9 – 1872 Cup 1st Leg

Round 10

Round 11

Round 12

Round 13

Round 14

Round 15

Round 16

Round 17

Round 18 - 1872 Cup 2nd Leg

Play-offs

Quarter-final

European Champions Cup

In a re-run of last season and the season before, Glasgow Warriors were again paired with Exeter Chiefs in the Champions Cup. The French opposition were La Rochelle, whom Glasgow had also faced in the 2019–20 season.

Pool

Results

Round 1

Round 2

Round 3

Round 4

European Challenge Cup

Round of 16

Quarter-final

Warrior of the month awards

End of Season awards

Competitive debuts this season

A player's nationality shown is taken from the nationality at the highest honour for the national side obtained; or if never capped internationally their place of birth. Senior caps take precedence over junior caps or place of birth; junior caps take precedence over place of birth. A player's nationality at debut may be different from the nationality shown. Combination sides like the British and Irish Lions or Pacific Islanders are not national sides, or nationalities.

Players in BOLD font have been capped by their senior international XV side as nationality shown.

Players in Italic font have capped either by their international 7s side; or by the international XV 'A' side as nationality shown.

Players in normal font have not been capped at senior level.

A position in parentheses indicates that the player debuted as a substitute. A player may have made a prior debut for Glasgow Warriors in a non-competitive match, 'A' match or 7s match; these matches are not listed.

Tournaments where competitive debut made:

Crosshatching indicates a jointly hosted match.

Sponsorship
 SP Energy Networks – Title Sponsor and Community Sponsor
 Scottish Power – Official Kit

Official kit supplier
 Macron

Official kit sponsors
 Malcolm Group
 McCrea Financial Services
 Denholm Oilfield
 Ross Hall Hospital
 Story Contracting
 Leidos

Official sponsors
 The Famous Grouse
 Clyde Travel Management
 Harper Macleod
 Caledonia Best
 Eden Mill Brewery and Distillery
 David Lloyd Leisure
 Crabbie's
 CALA Homes
 Capital Solutions
 Martha's Restaurant
 Sterling Furniture

Official partners
 A.G. Barr
 Benchmarx
 Black & Lizars
 Cameron House
 Glasgow Airport
 Healthspan Elite
 KubeNet
 Mentholatum
 MSC Nutrition
 Smile Plus
 Lenco Utilities
 Scot JCB News Scotland
 HF Group
 Primestaff
 Village Hotel Club
 The Crafty Pig
 Kooltech
 Savills
 iPro Sports
 RHA

References

2021-22
2021–22 in Scottish rugby union
2021–22 United Rugby Championship by team
2021–22 European Rugby Champions Cup by team